Stigmella ipomoeella is a moth of the family Nepticulidae. It is known from Sri Lanka.

The larvae feed on Ipomoea species. They probably mine the leaves of their host plant.

External links
Nepticulidae and Opostegidae of the world

Nepticulidae
Moths of Asia
Moths described in 1976